Gazpachuelo is a soup originating in Málaga, Spain and is a typical fisherman's dish, consisting of mayonnaise, garlic, egg yolk and olive oil. The white of egg is added to thicken the mixture along with cubed potatoes.

Although it is consumed hot, it owes its name to the fact that it contains the four basic ingredients of gazpacho: bread, garlic, oil and water. It is a typical dish of the lower classes because of the low cost of the basic ingredients. It is eaten with a spoon and bread dipped into the broth. Other variations that can be cooked are to boil the potatoes with shell fish, peeled shrimps or whitebait.

Andalusian cuisine
Spanish soups and stews